Aaron Ketchell (born 18 March 1977) is an Australian former professional rugby league footballer who played in the 1990s.

Background
A Tully Tigers junior, Ketchell attended Tully State High School, where he represented the Australian Schoolboys in 1994.

Playing career
In 1995, Ketchell signed with the newly-established North Queensland Cowboys, and was the youngest player in the club's inaugural first grade squad. Cowboys' head coach at the time, Grant Bell, later said of Ketchell, "He was regarded as the next big thing."

In Round 20 of the 1995 ARL season, Ketchell made his first grade debut for the North Queensland Cowboys as an 18-year old in a 10–12 loss to the Western Reds. In his rookie season, he played three games for the club. Over the next two seasons, Ketchell would play nine more games for the Cowboys, before being released at the end of the 1997 season.

Statistics

ARL/Super League

References

1977 births
Living people
Australian rugby league players
Rugby league players from Queensland
Indigenous Australian rugby league players
North Queensland Cowboys players
Rugby league second-rows
Place of birth missing (living people)